Alvescot railway station was a railway station between the Oxfordshire villages of Alvescot and Black Bourton, in England.

History
Situated on the Alvescot-Clanfield road, the station served the village of Alvescot, situated less than half a mile to the north, and also the neighbouring village of Black Bourton.

A small single-platform station was provided without a passing loop or signal box. Ground frames controlled the access to the two goods sidings which trailed off the single track line at the western end of the platform to serve coal staithes, cattle pens and a goods shed. A single refuge siding on the Down side lay just beyond the western end of the station. Next to the station building was a Great Western Railway-type Pagoda shed and to the rear of the building, adjacent to the station forecourt, was a goods lock-up and a brick weigh house.

In 1923, the station issued 9,046 tickets and handled 424 parcels and 9,616 tons of goods. In 1944, Carterton station was opened  to the east of Alverscot. During the "Arctic" winter of 1946-7, the line was severed at Alvescot when a large snow drift blocked the line. An emergency service was maintained with services running from either end of the snow-filled cutting. During the final years before closure, a British Railways employee at Alvescot made a proposal for the line's operation using diesel railcars that, he claimed, would save at least £20,000. This was to no avail as the station was closed along with the East Gloucestershire Railway on 18 June 1962.

Present day 
The goods yard remains occupied by G.F. Luckett, coal merchant, now supplied by road. All the station buildings have been demolished and the remainder of the site is a light industrial area. The station house still stands and is called "Station Bungalow". Large sections of trackbed between Alvescot and  remain intact.

References

Notes

Sources

External links
Photos and details about the station
Station on a navigable O.S. map
Archived page with post-closure details of stations

Disused railway stations in Oxfordshire
Former Great Western Railway stations
Railway stations in Great Britain opened in 1873
Railway stations in Great Britain closed in 1962
West Oxfordshire District